Alice Marble (September 28, 1913 – December 13, 1990) was an American tennis player who won 18 Grand Slam championships between 1936 and 1940: five in singles, six in women's doubles, and seven in mixed doubles. She was ranked world No. 1 in 1939.

Early life
Born in the small town of Beckwourth, California, Marble moved with her family at the age of five to San Francisco. A tomboy, she played seven sports at  San Francisco Polytechnic High School, including basketball and baseball, but her brother persuaded her to try tennis. She quickly mastered the game, playing in Golden Gate Park, and by age 15, won several California junior tournaments.

Tennis career
At the U.S. Championships, Marble won the singles title in 1936 and from 1938 to 1940, the women's doubles title with Sarah Palfrey Cooke from 1937 to 1940, and the mixed doubles title with Gene Mako in 1936, Don Budge in 1938, Harry Hopman in 1939, and Bobby Riggs in 1940.

At Wimbledon, Marble won the singles title in 1939; the women's doubles title with Cooke in 1938 and 1939 and the mixed doubles title with Budge in 1937 and 1938 as well as the mixed doubles title with Riggs in 1939.

In Wightman Cup team competition, Marble lost only one singles and one doubles match in the years she competed (1933, 1937–39).

According to A. Wallis Myers and John Olliff of The Daily Telegraph and the Daily Mail, Marble was ranked in the world top 10 from 1936 to 1939 (no rankings issued 1940–1945), reaching a career high in those rankings of world No. 1 in 1939. Marble was included in the year-end top ten rankings issued by the United States Lawn Tennis Association in 1932–33 and 1936–40. She was the top-ranked U.S. player from 1936 to 1940.

Marble was the Associated Press Athlete of the Year in 1939 and 1940.

After capping a stellar amateur career in 1940, Marble turned professional and earned more than $100,000, travelling around playing exhibition tournaments.

Retirement
For a brief time after retirement, she worked on the editorial advisory board of DC Comics and was credited as an associate editor on Wonder Woman. She created the "Wonder Women of History" feature for the comics, which told the stories of prominent women of history in comic form.

In her second autobiography Courting Danger (released after her death in 1990), Marble mentions that, back in the 1940s, she had married Joe Crowley around World War II, a pilot, who was killed in action over Germany. Only days before his death, she miscarried their child following a car accident. After an attempt to kill herself, she recuperated, and in early 1945, agreed to spy for U.S. intelligence. Her mission involved renewing contact with a former lover, a Swiss banker, and obtaining Nazi financial data. The operation ended when a Nazi agent shot her in the back after chasing her while she was trying to escape in a car, but she recovered. Few details of this operation have been corroborated by journalists and authors who tried to investigate this part of her life in the  years from the time of her death to the present. No Swiss banker has been discovered, leading to suspicions that this man of mystery might have been a Nazi, someone who Marble may have been trying to avoid having had an association.

Marble greatly contributed to the desegregation of American tennis by writing an editorial in support of Althea Gibson for the July 1, 1950 issue of American Lawn Tennis Magazine. The article read "Miss Gibson is over a very cunningly wrought barrel, and I can only hope to loosen a few of its staves with one lone opinion. If tennis is a game for ladies and gentlemen, it's also time we acted a little more like gentle-people and less like sanctimonious hypocrites...If Althea Gibson represents a challenge to the present crop of women players, it's only fair that they should meet that challenge on the courts." Marble said that, if Gibson were not given the opportunity to compete, "then there is an ineradicable mark against a game to which I have devoted most of my life, and I would be bitterly ashamed." Gibson, age 23, was given entry into the 1950 U.S. Championships, becoming the first African-American player, man or woman, to compete in a Grand Slam event.

In 1964, Marble was inducted into the International Tennis Hall of Fame. She settled in Palm Desert, California, where she taught tennis until her death. One of her students was Billie Jean King.

Weakened by pernicious anaemia, Marble died at a hospital in Palm Springs, California.

Legacy
Alice Marble Tennis Courts, providing a panoramic view of the Pacific Ocean and the Golden Gate bridge from the top of Russian Hill in San Francisco, is named in her honor.

Grand Slam finals

Singles (5 titles)

Doubles (6 titles)

Mixed doubles (7 titles)

Grand Slam singles tournament timeline

See also 
 Performance timelines for all female tennis players who reached at least one Grand Slam final

References

Sources
 Leary, Kevin. (December 14, 1990). "Ex-Tennis Champ Alice Marble". San Francisco Chronicle, p. B7.
 Marble, Alice with Dale Leatherman. Courting Danger. New York: St. Martin's Press. 1991.
 Rogers, Thomas. (December 14, 1990). "Alice Marble, 77, Top U.S. Tennis Star of 1930s". The New York Times, p. D23.
 Yardley, Jonathan. (June 12, 1991). "Sizzling Serves" The Washington Post, p. F2.

External links 
 

1913 births
1990 deaths
American female tennis players
American spies
Deaths from pernicious anemia
People from Plumas County, California
People from Palm Desert, California
International Tennis Hall of Fame inductees
United States National champions (tennis)
Wimbledon champions (pre-Open Era)
Grand Slam (tennis) champions in women's singles
Grand Slam (tennis) champions in women's doubles
Grand Slam (tennis) champions in mixed doubles
Professional tennis players before the Open Era
Tennis people from California
20th-century American women
20th-century American people
World number 1 ranked female tennis players